Mahipala I (913–944) ascended the throne of  Pratihara dynasty after his step brother Bhoja II. He was a son of Queen Mahidevi. Mahipala I was also known by the names: Ksitipala, Vinayakapala, Herambapala and Uttarapatha Swami.

Reign
It seems that Indra III's campaign did not influence Kannauj much and Mahipala I soon revived Kannauj as court poet Rajasekhara calls him Maharajadhiraja of Aryavarta. According to Kavyamimansa of Rajasekhara, Mahipala's reign extended from the upper course of the river Bias in the north-west to Kalinga or Orissa in the south-east, and from the Himalayas to the Kerala or Chera country in  the far south.
 
That Mahipala occupied territories up to Narbada is evident from Partabgarh inscription, which provides information about his son Mahendrapala II ruling at Ujjain in 946.  R. S. Tripathi asserts that as Mahendrapala II is not credited with any achievements so Mahipala I must be the king who recovered Ujjain.

The closing days of Mahipala's reign were disturbed by attacks by the Rashtrakutas on northern India as the Deoli and Karhad plates of Krisna III, while praising his achievement in the style of an inflated panegyric, inform that by hearing conquest of southern regions, the hope about Kalanjara and Citrakuta vanished from the heart of the Gurjara.

Arab chronicler Al-Masudi describes Mahipala I as follows:"The ruler has four armies according to the four quarters of the wind. Each of these number 700,000 or 900,000 men. He has large armies in the garrisons in the north and in the south; in the east and in the west, for he is surrounded on all sides by warlike rulers."Mahipala I, whom Kannada poet Pampa expressly calls "Gurjararaja", carried forward the work of his ancestors.

Dharanivaraha, a Chapa or Chavda ruler ruling at Vardhamana (now Wadhwan in Surashtra region of Gujarat) was a feudatory of Mahipala, which is mentioned in his grant dated 914.

References

10th-century Indian monarchs
944 deaths
Year of birth uncertain
Pratihara empire